Ayananka Bose is an Indian cinematographer of Bollywood films. He studied cinematography at the Film and Television Institute of Tamil Nadu, Chennai. He won the best cinematographer of Zee Cine Awards for the film Kites in 2011.

Early life

Bose Born in Meerut Uttarpradesh to a Bengali Bose Family, Bose was educated at the Film and Television Institute of Tamil Nadu and then received his early training from ace cinematographer & director Rajiv Menon. He has worked as an assistant director to Menon in Kandukondain Kandukondain (2000).

He then started assisting Ravi K. Chandran in films like Dil Chahta Hai, Kannathil Muthamittal, Koi... Mil Gaya, and Boys. He worked as the first assistant cameraman in Lakshya, camera operator in Black and associate cinematographer in Yuva before becoming independent.

His first film was Paheli starring Shah Rukh Khan and Rani Mukerji. He is one of very few cinematographers in India who works on TV commercials and films regularly.

Filmography

Awards and nominations

 2011 : Zee Cine Awards : Won for Best Cinematography for Kites.
 2009 : Filmfare Awards : Nominated for Best Cinematography for Dostana.

References

 https://www.hindustantimes.com/india/cinematographer-s-choice/story-WMITweX72mIfZWMHq061nK.html
 http://www.washingtonbanglaradio.com/content/5875510-kites-goes-bho-katta-kites-2010-hindi-movie-review-nilanjan-nandy
 https://www.thehindu.com/entertainment/movies/ayananka-bose-interview-duvvada-jagannadham-and-beyond/article19192925.ece

External links 

 
 Official website

Hindi film cinematographers
Living people
M.G.R. Government Film and Television Training Institute alumni
Cinematographers from Uttar Pradesh
People from Meerut
Year of birth missing (living people)